The 1975 New Mexico Lobos football team was an American football team that represented the University of New Mexico in the Western Athletic Conference (WAC) during the 1975 NCAA Division I football season.  In their second season under head coach Bill Mondt, the Lobos compiled a 6–5 record (4–3 against WAC opponents) and outscored opponents by a total of 291 to 232.

Steve Myer and Randy Rich were the team captains. The team's statistical leaders included Steve Myer with 2,501 passing yards, Mike Williams with 511 rushing yards, Preston Dennard with 962 receiving yards, and Gil Stewart and Preston Dennard, each with 36 points scored.

Schedule

Roster

References

New Mexico
New Mexico Lobos football seasons
New Mexico Lobos football